Wilmot is an unincorporated community in Washington Township, Noble County, in the U.S. state of Indiana.

History
A sawmill was started at Wilmot in 1848. A post office was established at Wilmot in 1850, and remained in operation until it was discontinued in 1911.

Geography

References

Unincorporated communities in Noble County, Indiana
Unincorporated communities in Indiana